The Miss Minnesota competition is the pageant that selects the representative for the state of Minnesota in the Miss America pageant. Women from Minnesota have won the Miss America crown on three occasions. The most recent winner was Gretchen Carlson in 1989.

Rachel Evangelisto of Minneapolis was crowned Miss Minnesota 2022 on June 17, 2022 at the Grace Church in Eden Prairie, Minnesota. She competed for the title of Miss America 2023 at the Mohegan Sun in Uncasville, Connecticut in December 2022.

Results summary
The following is a visual summary of the past results of Miss Minnesota titleholders at the national Miss America pageants/competitions. The year in parentheses indicates the year of the national competition during which a placement and/or award was garnered, not the year attached to the contestant's state title.

Placements 
 Miss America: BeBe Shopp (1948), Dorothy Benham (1977), Gretchen Carlson (1989)
 1st runners-up: Elaine Campbell (1947)
 2nd runners-up: N/A
 3rd runners-up: Lauren Susan Green (1985)
 4th runners-up: Arlene Anderson (1945), Nancee Parkinson (1962), Barbara Hasselberg (1965), Judy Mendenhall (1970), Rebecca Yeh (2014)
 Top 10: Florence Hunton (1943), Charlotte Sims (1968), Sheila Bernhagen (1972), Laurie Saarinen (1983)
 Top 12: Patricia Cummings (1944)
 Top 15: Lucille McGinty (1925), Marion Rudeen (1939), Gloria Burkhart (1949), Michaelene Karlen (2019)

Awards

Preliminary awards
 Preliminary Lifestyle and Fitness: BeBe Shopp (1948), Nancee Parkinson (1962), Judy Mendenhall (1970), Dorothy Benham (1977), Sue Erickson (1979), Debra Goodwin (1981)
 Preliminary Talent: Marion Rudeen (1939), Arlene Anderson (1945), Elaine Campbell (1947), Gloria Burkhart (1949), Barbara Hasselberg (1965), Judy Mendenhall (1970), Dorothy Benham (1977), Lauren Susan Green (1985), Gretchen Carlson (1989), Rebecca Yeh (2014), Brianna Drevlow (2018)

Non-finalist awards
 Non-finalist Talent: Keri Thorne (1976), Debra Goodwin (1981), Jo Bender (1993), Shawna Deeann Stoltenberg (1994), Jennifer Ostergaard (1998), Karyn Stordahl (2006), Nicole Swanson (2007), Brooke Kilgarriff (2010), Kathryn Knuttila (2011), Brianna Drevlow (2018)

Other awards
 Miss Congeniality: Madeline Van Ert (2017)
 Louanne Gamba Instrumental Award: Kathryn Knuttila (2011), Rebecca Yeh (2014)
 Quality of Life Award Winners: Jennifer Ostergaard (1998)
 Quality of Life Award Finalists: Jennifer Hudspeth (2008), Brooke Kilgarriff (2010), Kathryn Knuttila (2011), Natalie Davis (2012), Brianna Drevlow (2018)
STEM Scholarship Finalist: Gabrielle "Elle" Mark (2022)
 Waterford Business Management & Marketing Award: Paula Knoll (1996)

Winners

References

External links
 Miss Minnesota official website

Minnesota culture
Minnesota
Women in Minnesota
Recurring events established in 1925
1925 establishments in Minnesota
Annual events in Minnesota